Thanyapura Sports & Health Resort is a 23-hectare health, sports, mind and educational facility in Phuket, Thailand. There are two resort hotels, an award-winning restaurant, mind training centre and a lifestyle medicine centre.

Thanyapura Phuket hosts triathlon training camps with elite coaches. The facility has extensive tennis and swimming training facilities, a 50m and 25m Olympic-size swimming pool with Omega Track starting blocks, Daktronics timing system and an underwater video system.

References

External links

Phuket International Academy

Sports venues in Thailand
Buildings and structures in Phuket province
Tourist attractions in Phuket province